Salvatore Gallo (1928-1996) was an Italian artist and sculptor who was recognized for his work in France and abroad.

Early life
Gallo was born in 1928 in Vittoria, Sicily. He studied in Turin with Carlo Carra from 1946-49. In 1955, Gallo went to Mexico to study with David Siqueiros for two years.

In 1958, Gallo moved to New York, where he had his first major show at the Chiser Gallery. He then began a collaboration with his cousin Frank Gallo Professor of Art at Boston University. Upon, completing several major commissions together. they had a major exhibition of work in Tel Aviv, Israel. In 1964, Gallo moved to Paris.

In 1965, Gallo held his first major show at L’Academie Dufaux in Paris. At the same time, he took part in the Major exhibition “Art Fantastique” at the Langlois Gallery in Paris.

Gallo received major recognition when he exhibited his sculptures At the Italian Embassy in Paris and at the Musée National d'Art Moderne. In 1969 he participated in the exhibition "Since Rodin" where he was presented with the Medalle de bronze.

In 1970 he was honoured further in recognition of his work with the Medaille d’argent at the Biennale Internationale de Juvisy. in 1972 he won the Medaille d’ora at the Biennale Internationale de Juvisy, culminating with the honour Eme Grand Prix de Juan-les Pins. He started working at his new studio at La Maison des Artistes in the Nogent-sur-Marne commune in Paris.

Awards and commissions from 1975–1996
Medaille d’or au 14th Salon International de Paris Sud de Juvisy. 
1975  Participated in the 50th anniversary of the group of de Grear at the Chateau de Montvillargenne. That same year, Salvatore and Frank Gallo worked on monument projects in Dallas, Texas and several sculptures for the Playboy Club nightclubs.
1976  Exposition in Aurillac and the Exposition at Clermont Ferrand.
1977  La couleur dans de Ville Espace Cardin Salon de Mai in Paris Also the Salon de ‘La Jeune Sculpture” Salon des Realities Nouvelles.
1978  Exhibition for Salon de Mai in Paris
1980  Commission Memorial de la Paix in bronze
1981  Commission for the family Libreville, Gabon
1983 to 1985  Commissions for the Salon Du Group Dor
1986  Commission for the Coppia Gabon - Le Couple Port Gentil 
1988  Sculpture for Live Aid Afrique
1990  Private commission for the Salon Donatello
1995  Final exposition of key works for the Maison D`es Artistes

La Creation
In 1991, Gallo started work on his sculpture "La Creation". It was carved from a 35-ton slab of granite quartz sandstone and pyrite. The stone was excavated by workers near Gallo's country home in Marchais-Beton, a former commune in the Yonne department.

In 1995, Gallo was commissioned to create three sculptures for the new A5 autoroute. However, Gallo was diagnosed with terminal cancer and was unable to complete the commission. In response, Jean Antoine Winghart, president of the Paris Rhine Autoroute, offered to buy “La Creation” for the midpoint position on the A5 Autoroute at Villeneuve-Archbishop Yonne. The Paris Rhine Autoroute paid 1.96 million Francs for the piece in 1996.

Gallo completed "La Creation" and positioned it on site one week before he died.  It was officially unveiled on 21 June 1996, one week later.

References 
{ Société des Autoroutes Paris Rhin Rhône Service de la Communication Ref Mutualart.com, Major Companies of Europe}
{Jeanine Rivals}

External links
La Creation
A5 autoroute

Italian contemporary artists
Italian muralists
Modern painters
Modern sculptors
1928 births
1996 deaths
Art writers
Italian fascists
Italian male painters
Italian male sculptors
People from Vittoria, Sicily
Brera Academy alumni
Place of death missing
20th-century Italian painters
20th-century Italian sculptors
20th-century Italian male artists
Artists from Sicily